Djaptodji  is a rural commune of the Cercle of Douentza in the Mopti Region of Mali. The commune contains 64 small villages and in the 2009 census had a population of 36,263. The principal village (chef-lieu) is N'Gouma.

References

External links
.
.

Communes of Mopti Region